Jean-Philippe Daurelle (born 28 December 1963) is a French fencer. He won a bronze medal in the team sabre event at the 1992 Summer Olympics.

After he retired as an athlete he became a coach. He now trains the women's sabre French national team. Under his coaching, France won the silver medal in the 2014 European Fencing Championships and in the 2014 World Fencing Championships.

References

External links
 

1963 births
Living people
French male sabre fencers
Olympic fencers of France
Fencers at the 1992 Summer Olympics
Fencers at the 1996 Summer Olympics
Olympic bronze medalists for France
Olympic medalists in fencing
People from Antony, Hauts-de-Seine
Fencers from Paris
Medalists at the 1992 Summer Olympics
Sportspeople from Hauts-de-Seine
20th-century French people